, Op. 70, is a tone-poem for soprano and orchestra written in 1913 by the Finnish composer Jean Sibelius.  It was dedicated to Aino Ackté, who premiered the work at the Three Choirs Festival in Gloucester, England on 10 September 1913, with an orchestra conducted by Herbert Brewer.  Sibelius arranged it for voice and piano in 1915.

Luonnotar is based on Finnish mythology, the words coming from the Kalevala.  The text is from the first part of the Kalevala and deals with the creation of the world. Luonnotar or Ilmatar is the Spirit of Nature and Mother of the Seas.  Setting music to Finnish texts was relatively new to Sibelius, as his first language was Swedish and most of his earlier settings had been to Swedish texts (except Kullervo in 1892, which is entirely in Finnish).

Genesis
In 1894, Sibelius had the character of Luonnotar in mind when writing sketches for an opera.  The early drafts of his orchestral tone poem Pohjola's Daughter were called Luonnotar.  An 8-bar sketch later used in the work was written as early as May 1909.  However, his main work on the score was done in the summer of 1913, between his Fourth and Fifth symphonies.  He sent the score to Aino Ackté on 24 August, and they rehearsed it together on 3 September, a week before the premiere in Gloucester.

The first performance in Finland was in January 1914, again with Aino Ackté, the conductor being Georg Schnéevoigt.

The piece takes only about 10 minutes, but has been avoided by many singers because of its formidable challenges. It has a very high tessitura as well as a very wide range: the vocal range required of the soprano is from B just below middle C to C flat two octaves higher. There are leaps and drops of almost an octave, sometimes within a single word.  The work is often described in terms such as "fiendishly difficult to perform", "the cruel demands made of the soloist" and "the cruelly taxing nature of the solo part".

Elisabeth Schwarzkopf sang it in Helsinki in 1955, saying it was the "best thing she had ever done in her life". Other singers who have sung Luonnotar include Gwyneth Jones, Siv Wennberg, Elisabeth Söderström, Soile Isokoski, Taru Valjakka, Phyllis Curtin, Mari-Ann Häggander, Karita Mattila, Margarete Von Vaight, Phyllis Bryn-Julson, and Dawn Upshaw.

On 28 November 2008, the English National Opera preceded its production of Ralph Vaughan Williams's one-act opera Riders to the Sea with a performance of Luonnotar staged by Fiona Shaw with Susan Gritton as the soprano soloist. Gritton has also performed the piece with the BBC Philharmonic Orchestra under Edward Gardner.

Instrumentation
The instrumentation is: 2 flutes (both with piccolo), 2 oboes, 2 clarinets in A, bass clarinet in B, 2 bassoons, 4 horns in F, 2 trumpets in A, 3 trombones, 4 timpani (2 players each with 2 timpani), 2 harps and strings.

Recordings
The first commercial recording was made in 1969, with Gwyneth Jones and the London Symphony Orchestra, conducted by Antal Doráti.

Among the most notable recordings are: 
 Soile Isokoski (soprano) with the Helsinki Philharmonic Orchestra, conducted by Leif Segerstam
 Phyllis Bryn-Julson (soprano) with the Royal Scottish National Orchestra, conducted by Sir Alexander Gibson_(conductor)

References

External links 
 
 Youtube: Schwarzkopf singing Luonnotar
 Vimeo: Helena Juntunen singing Luonnotar with the Helsinki Philharmonic, John Storgårds conducting

1913 compositions
Symphonic poems by Jean Sibelius
Music based on the Kalevala